Shahe is a town in the southwest of Ganyu County, in the north of Jiangsu province, China.

Administrative divisions 
As of 2020, Shahe includes the following 52 administrative villages:

 Zhengxiang Village
 Shuangdui Village
 Zhuwei Village
 Dagao Village
 Tuanjie Village
 Jiefang Village
 Chengzi Village
 Xinjian Village
 Youyi Village
 Louhe Village
 Xiyanzhuang Village
 Lianhe Village
 Liuzhuang Village
 Hengjie Village
 Xibei Village
 Xiahekou Village
 Xinzhuang Village
 Balichang Village
 Guanzhuang Village
 Wucun Village
 Zhulin Village
 Heyuan Village
 Jiangzhai Village
 Dingxiang Village
 Chenxiang Village
 Xutun Village
 Dazhan Village
 Chijin Village
 Zhutun Village
 Xiaozhan Village
 Beizhuguo Village
 Xiaobu Village
 Daling Village
 Mengcaobu Village
 Liucaobu Village
 Licaobu Village
 Shanlingfang Village
 Zhangzhuang Village
 Yinzhuang Village
 Weihe Village
 Xinxing Village
 Dongsheng Village
 Fuqiang Village
 Heping Village
 Tongxing Village
 Xinhe Village
 Taihe Village
 Xisheng Village
 Qianjin Village
 Dengzhai Village
 Dongdan Village
 Liuwei Village

Demographics 

According to the 2010 Chinese Census, Shahe has a population of 96,768, up from the 55,229 recorded in the 2000 Chinese Census.

References

Township-level divisions of Jiangsu
Lianyungang